Chile competed at the 2016 Winter Youth Olympics in Lillehammer, Norway from 12 to 21 February 2016.

Alpine skiing

Boys

Girls

Cross-country skiing

Boys

Freestyle skiing

Ski cross

Slopestyle

Snowboarding

Snowboard cross

Slopestyle

See also
Chile at the 2016 Summer Olympics

References

Nations at the 2016 Winter Youth Olympics
Chile at the Youth Olympics
2016 in Chilean sport